Michael Walsh (fl. 2015) is an Irish hurler who currently plays at senior level for the Kilkenny county team and for his club Young Irelands.

Walsh was part of the Kilkenny panel that won the 2015 All-Ireland Senior Hurling Final on 6 September against Galway.

References

Living people
Kilkenny inter-county hurlers
Young Irelands (Kilkenny) hurlers
Year of birth missing (living people)